Haxey and Epworth railway station served the towns of Haxey and Epworth on the Isle of Axholme, Lincolnshire, England. It closed to passengers in 1959 and completely in 1964.

From 2 January 1905, it provided an interchange with the Axholme Joint Railway, whose  station was immediately adjacent to it. Although the lines were connected, movement between the stations required two reversals. The interchange ceased on 1 February 1956 when the Haxey Junction to  section of the Axholme Joint Railway was closed.

Haxey was also the junction for the Bawtry to Haxey railway line, which was conceived as a trunk haul route for colliery output. The line never fulfilled that expectation, and the Haxey end may only have been used for wagon storage.

References

Bibliography

Disused railway stations in the Borough of North Lincolnshire
Former Great Northern and Great Eastern Joint Railway stations
Railway stations in Great Britain opened in 1867
Railway stations in Great Britain closed in 1959